State Highway 127 (SH 127) is a state highway in Uvalde County in the U.S. state of Texas that connects Sabinal and Concan in south Texas.

Route description
SH 127 begins in Sabinal at an intersection with  US 90 and  RM 187. The highway travels north through Sabinal along Center Street, concurrent with RM 187, before separating from that route and turning toward the northwest. After crossing the Sabinal River, the highway travels through unincorporated Uvalde County, intersecting  FM 30,  FM 1049, and  RM 2690. The route crosses the Frio River at Concan before ending at a junction with  US 83.

History
 The original SH 127 was designated on October 10, 1927 as a proposed route from Cotulla eastward through Tilden to Oakville. It was officially numbered SH 127 on November 15, 1927. On August 6, 1929, it extended northwest to SH 85. This route was cancelled on October 22, 1930, because La Salle county couldn't join the state to construct SH 2, so it was cancelled. This route was mostly restored starting on January 9, 1934 as SH 202. The current route of SH 127 was then designated on June 11, 1932.

Major intersections

References

127
Transportation in Uvalde County, Texas